Fisher Stadium is a 13,132-seat multi-purpose stadium in Easton, Pennsylvania. The stadium is home to the Lafayette College Leopards football team. It opened in 1926 as Fisher Field.

During 2006 and 2007, Fisher Field underwent a $33-million renovation.  It reopened in time for the 2006 college football season complete with new seating, a JumboTron, a new press box, FieldTurf, and field lighting. Construction of a Football Varsity House beyond the western endzone commenced in Fall 2006 and was completed before the 2007 season.

History

Erected in 1926, Fisher Field was named for Thomas Fisher, Lafayette College Class of 1888, who almost single-handedly raised the $445,000 needed for construction through fund-raising efforts and a sizable personal contribution.

The first football game played in the 18,000-seat structure came on September 25, 1926, with a 35-0 Leopard victory over Muhlenberg College.

In 1973, during the construction of Allan P. Kirby Field House, more than 4,500 seats were removed from the north stands to make room for the structure.

A $33 million renovation in 2006 and 2007 brought new spectator seating throughout the venue, including chair back seating in select areas, and additional visitor-side seating. A state-of-the-art FieldTurf surface, lights, and a press box were installed, and improved restroom and vending areas were also included. A 19-by-35 foot video matrix board, located in the northwest corner of the stadium, provides the Lafayette Sports Network telecast of the game and features "in-house" entertainment for Leopard fans.

The facility seats 13,132, with additional seating for 2,075 added for the Nov. 18 meeting with Lehigh University, which raised the capacity to 15,207.

The Leopards posted their inaugural victory at Fisher Field on November 11, 2006, when Lafayette defeated Georgetown, 45-14. Lafayette wide receiver Joe Ort set the single-game school record with 274 yards receiving in that contest.

On September 1, 2007, Lafayette opened its season hosting the first ever night football game at Fisher Stadium. Lafayette defeated Marist College of the Metro Atlantic Athletic Conference 49-10.

Jim Finnen was the public-address announcer at Fisher Field for 50 years. He retired in 2014.

The Rivalry

When Lafayette College is host for The Rivalry with Lehigh University every other year, more than 3,500 temporary seats are erected to accommodate the sellout crowd of 17,000. These temporary seats are left standing during the week for use at the Phillipsburg-Easton game. Thus the total number of seats for the high school football game vary from year to year.

To commemorate the 150th edition of The Rivalry, the 2014 contest, a Lafayette home game, was held at Yankee Stadium.

Hosting the Easton-Phillipsburg game
Fisher Field at Fisher Stadium acts as neutral site for the traditional high school football rivalry between Easton Area High School in Easton and Phillipsburg High School of Phillipsburg, New Jersey. In 2006, the game between the two teams was televised nationally on ESPN2 as part of the High School Showcase. Easton won that game 21-7, the 100th meeting of these two cross-state rivals.

See also
 List of NCAA Division I FCS football stadiums

References

External links

College football venues
Lafayette Leopards football
Multi-purpose stadiums in the United States
American football venues in Pennsylvania
Buildings and structures in Northampton County, Pennsylvania
Easton, Pennsylvania
1926 establishments in Pennsylvania
Sports venues completed in 1926